Alice Jouenne ( Stein; August 14, 1873 – January 10, 1954) was a French educator and socialist activist. During the interwar period, Jouenne focused on education, pacifism, and feminism.

Early life and education
Alice Stein was born in Chamagne (Vosges), August 14, 1873. Of Alsatian origin, her parents fled the German occupation after the Franco-Prussian War which saw Alsace come under German rule.

Jouenne trained as a teacher at the École Normale in Nancy, graduating in 1890.

Career
Her first appointment to a teaching position was in Badonviller where she worked for several years before moving to a private Parisian institution.

In 1904, she married Victor Jouenne, a socialist and cooperator who introduced her to his ideas. This led to her joining the cooperative "La Prolétarienne" in the 5th arrondissement.

Early activisism
The following year, she became secretary of the education committee of the new  (National Federation of Consumer Cooperatives).

Three women made speeches at the event: Jouenne, Louise Saumoneau and Maria Vérone.

That year, Jouenne helped to establish the children's newspaper, becoming a contributor. 

In January 1913, Louise Saumoneau, Marianne Rauze, Élisabeth Renaud, Jouenne and others founded the Socialist Women's Group (Groupe des Femmes Socialistes, GDFS) for women within the SFIO. Jouenne was in the GDFS for ten years, during which time she joined Freemasonry's Le Droit Humain.

Jouenne contributed to the redesign of La Voix des femmes, the first issue of which came out on October 18, 1919 and included articles by Marthe Bigot, Louise Bodin, Annette Charreau, Fanny Clar, Magdeleine Marx, Marianne Rauze, Henriette Sauret, Monette Thomas, as well as herself. She was also a journalist for L'Humanité and secretary to Marcel Cachin, director of the newspaper, until 1920 when she did not follow him in his change of direction linked to the Third International.

Interwar period
During the interwar period, Jouenne's attention was focused on education, pacifism, and feminism, in line with the trends of the times. She wrote a book about the outdoor school. 

Jouenne retired in 1933 and left her school. Three years later, Suzanne Lacore appointed Jouenne as her Chef de Cabinet in her position as Undersecretary of State for Children in Léon Blum's first regime.

Death
Alice Jouenne died in Paris, January 10, 1954.

Selected works
 La Femme et la Coopération, 1911
 Les Appels du coeur chez l'institutrice, 1925
 Les idées de Madame Fleury, 1926 
 Une expérience d’éducation nouvelle, l’école de plein air, 1927
 L'enfance et la coopération, 1929

References

External links
 "Alice Jouenne, l'héroïne vosgienne du Front Populaire", podcast via Radio France (1 July 2022)

1873 births
1954 deaths
People from Vosges (department)
French socialists
20th-century French educators
Women educational theorists
20th-century French women politicians
French pacifists
French feminists
Political activists
Women founders
School founders